Hiro Sasaki was a professional wrestler

Championships and accomplishments
NWA New Zealand
NWA Australasian Tag Team Championship (1 time) - with King Kamaka

World Wrestling Council
WWC World Tag Team Championship (1 time) - with Kengo Kimura

References

Japanese male professional wrestlers